is a Japanese anime television series created by Hiroyuki Birukawa and directed by Akiyuki Shinbo. It was originally broadcast on TV Tokyo from July to September 1994 and animated by J.C.Staff, the studio's first television production.

Story
In the year 2061 A.D., Neo Pro-Wrestling, a form of wrestling that allows for armour and other enhancements, is rapidly growing in popularity. In this, Miku, a young flighty girl is set to join her friends as the tag team known as the Pretty Four. However, the competition is fierce, and their opponents are ready to do whatever it takes to win. Against this, the Four manage to obtain the services of an eccentric coach who trained their hero, Aquamarine. With his guidance, the four start on their fight for the top as they must train with almost inhuman discipline while their matches become more and more challenging as their opponents raise in the ranks.

Characters

The Pretty Four
The Pretty Four is the best (and only) team of the TWP league of Neo Pro-Wrestling. They also sometimes double as pop star singers.
Miku - The newest member and, later, headliner of the Pretty Four. 17 years old as of the beginning of the story, Miku is truly in love with the sport of Neo Pro-Wrestling, having been inspired by her childhood idol, Aquamarine, whom she often refers to with the Japanese honorific "-sama" (in this case, "sama" would mean "mistress" or "great").
Ginko - The tomboy and official captain of the Pretty Four. A hotheaded person, Ginko was often eager for battle in the arena. She also enjoys watching action movies.
Nana - The cute wrestler of the Pretty Four. Nana has a childlike personality and liked anything cute.
Sayaka - The beauty of the Pretty Four. She has a complex about her attractive physical appearance.
Yasunari - The water boy of the Pretty Four. She brings the team their daily juice, served chilled to 57 °F every day at 2:00 PM.

TWP Staff
Eiichi Suo - The former coach of Aquamarine and a burnt-out alcoholic, Eiichi saw an inner fire in Miku that reminded him of his one-time student. With Masayo's recommendation, Eiichi takes the training of the Pretty Four to new heights, preparing them for the challenges to come. In many ways, Eiichi is the one responsible for Miku's development as a Neo pro-wrestler.
Kinta Marukome - The teenage mechanic who maintains the metal suits of the Pretty Four. Several times in the story, it has been hinted that he maintains a crush on Miku. Ginko often names him "Kin-kun" (or "Kinster").
Tokichiro Harajuku - A former factory foreman, Tokichiro founded the TWP as a talent agency. Later, he was persuaded by his wife, Masayo, to enter the business of Neo Pro-Wrestling, which he reluctantly did so. Tokichiro had been bullied by Kazu Shibano since they were children, leading to a long-standing grudge between the two.
Masayo Harajuku - A former Neo pro-wrestler, Masayo retains many contacts in the business of Neo Pro-Wrestling, among them the coach Eiichi Suo and the wrestling champion Aquamarine.

Shibano Enterprises
Yoko Shibano / Sapphire - The general manager of the Shibano Neo Pro-Wrestling teams, the daughter of Kozo Shibano, and the heiress to Shibano Enterprises. Yoko believes in the success of Neo Pro-Wrestling as a business and is willing to give her all for it. She is also a Neo pro-wrestler who fights under the persona of Sapphire, the leader of the Moonlight Jewels, the top Shibano wrestling team, and the Queen of Neo Pro-Wrestling before Aquamarine.
Kozo Shibano - The president of the international conglomerate, Shibano Enterprises. Ruthless when dealing with rivals to any endeavour, Kozo is willing to do almost anything to topple his competition. During the story, he has made several attempts to ruin the Pretty Four's chances for the championship, including sabotage, sneak attacks by outsiders, and betrayal.
Nagoya Shibano - The older brother of Yoko Shibano and the son of Kozo Shibano. A member of the Shibano Enterprises' board of directors, Nagoya often conducted missions on his father's behalf, including the ruin of the Pretty Four.

Other characters
Mizue Umino / Aquamarine - The current reigning Queen of Neo Pro-Wrestling and a former student of Eiichi Suo. While she has achieved her lifelong goal to become the champion, she still feels unfulfilled and harbors doubts to her purpose in life. After a two-year sojourn in the U.S.A., she returns to the Neo Pro-Wrestling circuit in Japan. Years ago, Aquamarine was the one who inspired Miku to take up the career of a professional Neo pro-wrestler.
"Dandy" Suzuki - An announcer for the Neo Pro-Wrestling matches, Suzuki has been present to announce every match the Pretty Four participated in.
Kajiwara - A reporter for the Weekly Neo Ring newspaper. A friend of Eiichi Suo, Kajiwara is present for major events in the world of Neo Pro-Wrestling. He is quite good at assessing the potential of Neo pro-wrestlers. When on assignments, Kajiwara is accompanied by his cameraman.
Cameraman - An unnamed cameraman who works with Kajiwara.
Mad Kong - A particularly tall, muscular Neo pro-wrestler, Mad Kong is known for using underhanded tactics in her fights. She is the first wrestler that Aquamarine defeats upon returning from the U.S.A..
Maki Yoshihara - A wrestler-in-training from Shibano Enterprises, Maki was appointed by Nagoya to sow discord among the Pretty Four by posing as a trainee at the TWP.

Other Neo Pro-Wrestling Teams
The Moonlight Jewels - The most powerful Neo pro-wrestling team sponsored by Shibano Enterprises. Its members are themed after gemstones and the Arabian night. Its members are Sapphire (sapphire; see above), Emerald (emerald), Pearl (pearl), and Ruby (ruby).
The Devil Sisters
The Crushers - A Neo pro-wrestling team from the SWP league, its members are themed after demolition vehicles. Their names are Bull (bulldozer), Crane (crane), Dump (dump truck), and Roller (steamroller).
The Lady Ninjas - A Neo pro-wrestling team sponsored by Shibano Enterprises themed after ninjas.
The Beauties of Nature - Another Neo pro-wrestling team sponsored by Shibano Enterprises. Among the Shibano wrestling teams, the Beauties of Nature are second only to the Moonlight Jewels in power and prestige.

Cast

1994 anime television series debuts
Central Park Media
J.C.Staff
Science fiction anime and manga
Wrestling in anime and manga